Chamoli Gopeshwar is a township in the Garhwal hills and a municipal board within Chamoli district. It is the administrative headquarters of the Chamoli District of Uttarakhand in India. Chamoli Gopeshwar has a very beautiful kund that is Vaitrani.

Famous places in Chamoli Gopeshwar include Pt. Dindayal Park, Kunds, the Gopinath Temple, and the Telephone Tower House. The only T.B. Hospital in Chamoli District is located in Gopeshwar. A sports stadium is located on a portion of the property making up the police grounds. Major colonies are Pwd Colony, Jal Nigam, Wireless Colony, Police Colony, Kund Colony, Post Office, Basant bihar, Saraswati Bihar, Subhash Nagar, Haldapani, Negwar, Mandir Colony, Teacher Colony, Hospital Colony and Polytechnic Colony.

Geography
Gopeshwar is able to captivate any visitor with its mystic charm and pristine beauty. There are multiple snow-capped hills and peaks visible from Gopeshwar.

Climate
Classified by Köppen-Geiger system as humid subtropical climate (Cwa).

Demographics
 India census, Chamoli Gopeshwar had a population of 21,447. The total number of households are 5513. Males constitute 56% of the population and females 44%. Chamoli Gopeshwar has an average literacy rate of 81%, higher than the national average of 59.5%; with male literacy at 85% and female literacy at 75%. 10% of the population is under 6 years of age.

How to Reach 
Gopeshwar is well connected by road and is accessible throughout the year. The nearest airport is located in the Jolly Grant, Dehradun and is around 227 kilometers away from Gopeshwar. The nearest railway station is Rishikesh at a distance of around 210 kilometers.

Places of interest
Gopeshwar is surrounded by four famous temples: Tungnath, Anusuya Devi Temple, Rudranath, and Badrinath. The holy town of Kedarnath is also nearby.

A famous temple of Lord Shiva, now known as Gopinath Mandir, is situated there. There is also a kund (pond) known as Vaitrani. There are many parks like as Eco Park, Deen dayal park and Sri Chakrdhar Tiwari Park.

Media and communications
All India Radio has a local station in Gopeshwar which transmits various programs of mass interest.

Schools and colleges 
Gopeshwar is the famous education hub in district Chamoli. There are many schools, colleges and coaching centres

Schools-

Sri Guru Ram Rai Public School(BEST) 
 Kendriya Vidyalaya Gopeshwar
 Subodh Prem Vidya Mandir
 Shri Ram Chandra Bhatt Vidya Mandir Inter College
 PEACE PUBLIC SCHOOL GOPESHWAR  
 Christ Academy (Best)
 Sharada Suman Children's Academy
 National Public School
 Himalayan Public School
 Gopinath Children's Academy 
 Uttarakhand Public School 
 Nalanda Public School
 Adarsh Vidya Mandir
 Sharswati Vidya Mandir
 Govt. Girls Inter College
 Govt. Inter College

Engineering Institute- 
 Institute of Technology Gopeshwar (A state Government Institute) is one of the 07 government Engineering Institute of Uttarakhand Government and located at Gopeshwar. It is well known for its high class infrastructure, well qualified faculties and remarkable exponential growing Institute.

Higher education college- 
 Govt. P.G. college Gopeshwar
 Govt. Law college Gopeshwar
 Govt. Polytechnic Gopeshwar
 Govt. Nursing College Gopeshwar

References

External links
 Gopeshwar, Official website
 Gopeshwar Job hirings Website
Chamoli Information Guide

Cities and towns in Chamoli district